Losseni Konaté (born 29 December 1972) is a former Ivorian footballer who played as a goalkeeper. He played for ASEC Mimosas, US Monastir, and JJK Jyväskylä during his professional career. Konaté was a regular choice for the Ivory Coast national football team during the 1990s, as the successor of Alain Gouaméné.

Konaté played for Ivory Coast at the 1987 FIFA U-16 World Championship in Canada and the 1991 FIFA World Youth Championship in Portugal.

References

1972 births
Living people
Ivorian footballers
Ivory Coast under-20 international footballers
Ivory Coast international footballers
1992 King Fahd Cup players
1992 African Cup of Nations players
1994 African Cup of Nations players
1998 African Cup of Nations players
2002 African Cup of Nations players
Ivorian expatriate footballers
Association football goalkeepers
ASEC Mimosas players
US Monastir (football) players
Expatriate footballers in Tunisia
Expatriate footballers in Finland
Ivorian expatriate sportspeople in Tunisia
Africa Cup of Nations-winning players
Ivory Coast youth international footballers